Erin Boag (born 17 March 1975) is a professional ballroom dancer. She has danced from the age of three, originally starting ballet and later moving into ballroom, Latin and jazz. Born in Auckland, New Zealand, she moved to Australia as a teenager to progress her dancing career, before moving to London in 1996.

She started professionally dancing and is well known for being on Strictly Come Dancing in the UK with her partner Anton du Beke.

Boag is an honorary patron of the theatre charity The Music Hall Guild of Great Britain and America.

Professional career
Boag's regular professional partner is Anton du Beke. They met in 1997, and won the 1998 and 1999 New Zealand Championships. They turned professional in 2002, competing mainly in the United Kingdom. Their best result on the competition circuit was in November 2003 when they won the IDTA Classic in Brighton. They appeared on the first 10 series of Strictly Come Dancing. Boag has not appeared as a professional on Strictly Come Dancing since Series 10, although du Beke still appears on the show. She made a brief cameo in 2015, giving advice to contestant Katie Derham, who was partnered with du Beke that year.

Strictly Come Dancing

Highest- and lowest-scoring performances per dance

From 2004 to 2012, Boag competed as one of the professional partners in ten series and six Christmas specials of the BBC celebrity ballroom competition show, Strictly Come Dancing.

In the show's first series, Boag was partnered up with former England rugby league player, Martin Offiah. They were eliminated in week six of the competition, finishing in fourth place.

In the show's second series, Boag was partnered up with comedian, Julian Clary. They reached the finals of the competition, but were eliminated in third place.

In the show's third series, Boag was partnered up with former Olympic athlete, Colin Jackson. They also reached the finals of the competition, but were named the runners-up to cricketer Darren Gough and his professional partner, Lilia Kopylova. She and Jackson later competed in the 2005 Christmas special, where they finished in fifth place.

In the show's fourth series, Boag was partnered up with former Danish professional footballer, Peter Schmeichel. They were eliminated on the seventh week of the competition, finishing in seventh place. She later reunited with Jackson to compete in the 2006 Christmas special, and were voted the winners of the competition.

In the show's fifth series, Boag was partnered up with former professional snooker player, Willie Thorne. They were eliminated on the second week of the competition, finishing in thirteenth place.

In the show's sixth series, Boag was partnered up with former England rugby union player, Austin Healey. They reached the quarter-finals of the competition, but were eliminated in fourth place.

In the show's seventh series, Boag was partnered up with former EastEnders actor, Ricky Groves. They were eliminated in week ten of the competition, finishing in sixth place. She later participated in the 2009 Christmas special, where she was partnered with her former celebrity partner Austin Healey. They finished the Christmas special in joint-fifth place, alongside Ricky Whittle and his professional partner, Natalie Lowe.

In the show's eighth series, Boag was partnered up with former England professional footballer, Peter Shilton. They were eliminated in week four of the competition, finishing in twelfth place. She later participated in the 2010 Christmas special, where she was partnered with Liberal Democrats politician, Vince Cable. They finished the Christmas special in second place, losing to actor John Barrowman and his professional partner, Kristina Rihanoff.

In the show's ninth series, Boag was partnered up with comedian and impressionist, Rory Bremner. They became the third couple to be eliminated from the competition, finishing in twelfth place. She later competed in the 2011 Christmas special, where she was partnered with former professional boxer, Barry McGuigan. They finished the Christmas special in joint-second place, alongside Simon Webbe and his professional partner, Katya Virshilas.

In the show's tenth series, Boag was partnered up with television presenter, Richard Arnold. They became the sixth couple to be eliminated from the competition, finishing in ninth place. The tenth series was her final series before being replaced by Janette Manrara in the eleventh series.

Series 1 - with celebrity partner Martin Offiah; placed 4th

Series 2 - with celebrity partner Julian Clary; placed 3rd

Series 3 - with celebrity partner Colin Jackson; placed 2nd 

Series 4 - with celebrity partner Peter Schmeichel; placed 7th

Series 5 - with celebrity partner Willie Thorne; placed 13th 

Series 6 - with celebrity partner Austin Healey; placed 4th 

Series 7 - with celebrity partner Ricky Groves; placed 6th

Series 8 - with celebrity partner Peter Shilton; placed 12th

Series 9 - with celebrity partner Rory Bremner; placed 12th

Series 10 - with celebrity partner Richard Arnold; placed 9th

Personal life
After they were introduced by Camilla Dallerup, Boag became engaged to business consultant Peter O'Dowd on Christmas Eve 2007. The couple were married on 17 June 2009, in Italy. On 24 April 2014, Erin gave birth by emergency caesarean section to a baby boy, named Ewan Robert Geoffrey O'Dowd. He was born on his father's 50th birthday; Boag's professional dancing partner Anton du Beke is the child's godfather.

Dance tours and other professional engagements 
In August 2017, Erin and du Beke announced a three-month 2018 UK Tour From Broadway to Hollywood.

In September 2018, Erin announced she would be appearing with du Beke at Donahey's Dancing with The Stars Weekends. The tour was to comprise three weekend breaks in England and Wales in 2019, and to feature the stars of Strictly Come Dancing teaching and performing.

References

External links
 

1975 births
Living people
People from Auckland
New Zealand ballroom dancers
21st-century New Zealand dancers
New Zealand expatriates in England